Everything Is Beautiful is the debut full-length studio album by American recording artist Kurt Travis, released on May 14, 2014, on Blue Swan Records. "Brain Lord" was released as the lead single on April 22, 2014. The album is his first release on Blue Swan since departing with his previous record label Equal Vision Records.

Background

Everything Is Beautiful was written throughout a 2 to 3 year time period between Kurt Travis and Strawberry Girls guitarist Zachary Garren. Inspiration for the album derived from At the Drive-In and Geoff Rickly of Thursday. The percussionist for Travis' band A Lot Like Birds, Joe Arrington, recorded drums and percussion for the album. Former Dance Gavin Dance guitarist Josh Benton served as producer. In support of the album, Travis toured in North America from May 14 to June 7, 2014 with supporting acts Hotel Books and So Much Light, presented by Blue Swan Records.

Sound and influence

Kurt Travis described the album as mixture of alternative rock, indie pop, new wave, electronica, folk, and R&B. The album was described as ambient and "DGD-influenced" by Sputnikmusic.

Reception

In a review from Sputnikmusic editor Daniel David, the album received a rating of 4.0 out of 5, with an "excellent" rating and was listed at No. 127 for the year 2014. In the review, David talks about the album's sound comparing it to Smashing Pumpkins and Foo Fighters:

Deadpress presented the album with a rating of 6 out of 10 stars calling Travis' vocal range "the least striking of all of Dance Gavin Dance's vocalists past and present" and called it a "catchy and entertaining LP."

Track listing

Personnel
 Kurt Travis - songwriting, vocals, guitar
 Zachary Garren (of Strawberry Girls) - songwriting, guitars
 Joe Arrington (of A Lot Like Birds) - drums, percussion
 Josh Benton - production
 Kris Crummett - mixing

References

2014 debut albums
Kurt Travis albums
Blue Swan Records albums